The Warrenpoint and Rostrevor Tramway operated  narrow gauge, horse-drawn tramway services between Warrenpoint and Rostrevor, County Down, Ireland from 1877 to 1915.

History
The Warrenpoint and Rostrevor Tramway offered passengers a connection from its canopied terminus platform at Warrenpoint railway station through to Rostrevor. The company was established in 1875 and services started in 1877. It was promoted by Francis Needham, 3rd Earl of Kilmorey. It was the first tramway service in Ireland. The Earl sold the tramway in 1884 for £4,000 (equivalent to £ in ).  In 1910, the manager was Bernard Reilly.

Fares
In 1890 the fares were 
1st Class single 6d (equivalent to £ in ) 
1st Class return 9d (equivalent to £ in ) 
3rd Class single 4d (equivalent to £ in ) 
3rd Class return 6d (equivalent to £ in )

Extension plan
In 1908 plans were made to purchase the tramway, electrify it and extend it as far as Newcastle, County Down, however, these plans came to nothing.

Closure

Early in 1915 a storm washed away part of the line and following this, the service never resumed.

See also
 Newry, Warrenpoint and Rostrevor Railway

References

Tram transport in Ireland before partition
3 ft gauge railways in Ireland
Warrenpoint